Stadtmuseum Erlangen, or Erlangen City Museum, is a municipal museum dedicated to the history of the city of Erlangen, Germany. The museum is housed in the former Old Town 'Rathaus' (town hall), built in 1733/40, and an adjoining town house. Its courtyard serves as a venue for concerts, readings, film screenings, and other open-air events.

History 
Erlangen's first local history museum ('Heimatmuseum') was opened in 1919 in the former water tower (previously the university 'Karzer'). In 1964, the city museum was re-established and reopened in the former Old Town Hall under its current name.

Exhibitions 
The permanent exhibition documents the region's history from pre-historic times to the 20th century, with a focus on Erlangen's Baroque era with the erection of the planned New Town, its Huguenot manufacturies, the Margravial residence, and the fouding of today's Friedrich-Alexander-Universität Erlangen-Nürnberg, Bavaria's second-biggest university. Other topics include the Industrial Age and the transformation of the city within the context of German history. The tour ends with Erlangen's development as a "Siemens town" following the end of World War II. The museum houses a significant collection on Huguenot trades (stocking weavers, glove makers, white tanners and carpet weavers).

Changing exhibitions cover a broad variety of topics, such as important events in the city's history, the history of science and medicine, and the visual arts.

Gallery

References

External links 
Official website

Erlangen
Museums established in 1919
Museums in Germany
Museums in Bavaria
City museums in Germany
Historic house museums in Germany